Helen Olaye (born 30 August 1946) is a Nigerian sprinter. She competed in the women's 200 metres at the 1972 Summer Olympics.

References 

1946 births
Living people
Athletes (track and field) at the 1972 Summer Olympics
Nigerian female sprinters
Olympic athletes of Nigeria
Place of birth missing (living people)
Olympic female sprinters
20th-century Nigerian women